Thomas Daniel Cruise (born 9 March 1991) is an English former professional footballer who played as a left back. He has played in the Football League for Carlisle United and Torquay United. He is a product of the Arsenal Academy who came to prominence during 2008–09 FA Youth Cup.

Club career
Cruise was born in Islington, Greater London. He joined in and made his debut for Arsenal F.C. Reserves in November 2007. Through Arsenal Academy, Cruise was a member of the FA Youth Cup winning team in 2008–09. On 9 December 2009, with Arsenal having qualified for the knockout stage of the 2009–10 UEFA Champions League as winners of Group H, manager Arsène Wenger played a number of youth players in the final group match against Olympiacos. Cruise started the match, giving him his first and only senior appearance for the club, playing the whole game. On 3 November 2010, he joined League One club Carlisle United on loan. On 17 June 2011, Arsenal's website announced; "Arsenal Football Club can confirm that Mark Randall, Thomas Cruise and Roarie Deacon will reach the end of their contracts with the Club this month to become free agents."

Following his release from Arsenal, Cruise had a trial with Serie B side Sampdoria. Cruise also had a trial at League One side Scunthorpe United in late 2011. On 20 February 2012, Major League Soccer (MLS) side New England Revolution claimed Cruise was training at the club for a two-week trial with a move to the New England Revolution.
In June 2012, he signed a one-year deal with Torquay United. 
On 24 May 2013, he signed a new one-year deal with Torquay. It was announced in April 2015, that Cruise and a number of other players would be released from the club.

In 2016, he began training to become an accountant.

International career
In 2007, he was called up to the England under-17 team. In October 2007, Cruise took part in the first round of qualifying for 2008 UEFA European Under-17 Championship, however he was replaced for the second round of qualifying in March 2008 due to an injury.

He was part of England U19 squad that reached the semi-finals of 2010 UEFA European Under-19 Championship and subsequently qualified for 2011 FIFA U-20 World Cup in Colombia as a result of finishing at least third in the group stages.

Career statistics

References

External links

England profile

1991 births
Living people
Footballers from Islington (district)
English footballers
England youth international footballers
Association football defenders
Arsenal F.C. players
Carlisle United F.C. players
Torquay United F.C. players
English Football League players